Mongolia participated in the 11th Asian Games, officially known as the XI Asiad held in Beijing, China September 22, 1990 to October 7.

Medal summary

Medals by sport

Medalists

Athletics

Boxing

Judo

Wrestling

References

External links

Nations at the 1990 Asian Games
1990
Asian Games